Bandelia is a genus of moths of the family Erebidae.

Taxonomy
The genus has previously been classified in the subfamily Phytometrinae within Erebidae or in the subfamily Acontiinae of the family Noctuidae.

Species
 Bandelia angulata (Barnes & Lindsey, 1922)
 Bandelia dimera (Dyar, 1912)

References

 Bandelia at Markku Savela's Lepidoptera and Some Other Life Forms
 Natural History Museum Lepidoptera genus database

Boletobiinae
Noctuoidea genera